Huacaltzintli was a Princess of Tlatelolco and Queen of Tenochtitlan. She was a daughter of the king Quaquapitzahuac and sister of the king Tlacateotl and queen Matlalatzin. Her husband was Itzcoatl, Aztec emperor. She bore him a son called Tezozomoc. She was a grandmother of kings Axayacatl, Tizoc and Ahuitzotl.

See also

List of Tenochtitlan rulers
Chichimecacihuatzin I
Aztec emperors family tree

Notes
Dictionnaire de la langue nahuatl classique
Anales de Tlatelolco

External links

 
Queens of Tenochtitlan
Tenochca nobility
15th-century indigenous people of the Americas
Nobility of the Americas